Nanoparia is an extinct genus of pareiasaur that lived in the Permian.

Description
 
It was about 60 cm in length, and weighed around 8 to 10 kilograms.

Classification
This is an unusual small, spiny specialised form. The skull is very similar to that of Pareiasaurus and Romer considered it a synonym of the latter. Orlov however (in Osnovy Paleontology, the monumental multi-volume Russian textbook of Paleontology) placed it in the Elginiinae. Kuhn (1969) however argues that while resembling Elginia in the ossifications at the rear of the skull, it differs completely in proportions and would not seem to be related. Lee (1997) considers it a basal member of the dwarf pareiasaurs. Nanoparia is believed to be among the pareiasaur genera most closely related to turtles.

References

External links
 Elginiidae and Pumiliopareiasauria at Palaeos

Pareiasaurs
Permian reptiles of Africa
Fossil taxa described in 1936
Prehistoric reptile genera